Simon Jowett is a British author and scriptwriter.

Biography
His early work was in comics, as the writer of the James Bond stories Silent Armageddon (1993, drawn by John M. Burns) and Shattered Helix (1994, drawn by David Jackson, over layouts and with colouring by David Lloyd) and as a contributor to 2000AD. He left comics largely behind in the mid-1990s, when he moved into script-writing for other media. He has worked on feature-length adaptations of children's fiction and has written scripts for a number of computer games, including the best-selling Fire Warrior and the landmark game/internet serial Halcyon Sun (with Jonathan Clements).

Jowett's broadcast television work includes Shane the Chef, which he co-created, A.T.O.M. (Jetix/Toon Disney), Chop Socky Chooks (Aardman Animations), Zula Patrol (Zeeter Productions), Pitt & Kantrop (Millimages), The Way Things Work (Millimages) and episodes of Bob the Builder (HIT Entertainment).

He is also the author of two novels and several children's books, including movie tie-ins to Finding Nemo and Wallace and Gromit. He has also contributed short stories and novellas set in the Warhammer 40K game universe to various anthologies published by the Black Library imprint of BL Publishing, a subsidiary of Games Workshop.

Television

Shane the Chef (2018) - Co-creator/Head Writer
Missing Mum 
Shane's World Record
All at Sea
Dancing Under the Stars
Drone Zone
Run For It
Nature Trail Trouble
Who's Cooking?
Mama's Bad Hair Day
Where's Eddy?
Dr Izzy
Honey Honey
Snow Wonder
Snow Food
Tilly and Friends (2012)
Pru's Parade
Hector's Pet 
Mouk (2011)
The Best Dressed Elephant 
Pet Squad - (2011)
It Came from Down Under
The New Kid
Rastamouse - (2011)
Da Rare Groove
Gigglebiz - (2009-2011)
Dennis & Gnasher - (2009-2010)
Dig This
Game On
The Great Outdoors
Bear Behaving Badly (2009)
Crazy Keith: Extreme Koala 
Timmy Time (2009) 
Go Kart Timmy
Timmy Needs a Bath
Chuggington (2008)
Wilson and the Wild Wind
Brewster Goes Bananas
Old Puffer Pete's Tour
Pinky and Perky Show (2008)
Pretty in Pork
You'll Believe a Pig Can Fly
Where Is Everybody?
Famous 5: On the Case (2008)
The Case of the Defective Detective
The Case of the Fudgie Fry Pirates
The Case of the Bogus Banknotes
The Zula Patrol (2006-2008)
The Lizard Who Came to Dinner
Island of the Endotherms
The Sound of Multo
Eyes in the Skies
Rock and Patrol
Support Your Neighborhood Volcano (2006)
Chop Socky Chooks (2008)
His Master's Choice
Enter the Chickens (story editor)
Combo Ninos (2006-2007)
DivinoDoro
Kissy Kissy Love Love
Los Rivlos
A.T.O.M. - Alpha Teens on Machines (2005-2007)
Serving Two Masters
Secret Admirer
Zoo Story
High Frontier
Resurrection
Fathers and Daughters
Daddy's Little Girl
The Experiment
Pitt and Kantrop (2005)
Ride 'Em, Pitt
Vacation Creation
Table for 15
Planet Cook (2004)
Monsters of the Deep

Electric Animals
Thunder and Lightning
Rainforests
The Way Things Work (2004)
The Sound of Mammoths/La Melodie des Mammouths
The Far Side
Shocking!
'Displace' Ain't Big Enough For The Both Of Us
Images
Take It To The Bridge
Under Pressure
On Squeezing Mammoths
That Sinking Feeling
Wilf The Witch's Dog (2002)
Card Tricks
The Little Fib
The Opposite Spell
Mad Gadgets
Wide Awake Wilf
Bob the Builder (1999 - 2002)
Ballroom Bob
Hamish's New Home
Spud the Pilot
Wendy's Removal Service
Bob and the Big Freeze
Inspector Spud
One Shot Wendy
Roley and the Rock Star
Special Delivery Spud
Roley's Tortoise
Dizzy's Birdwatch
Wendy's Big Match
Upstairs Downstairs Bears (2000)
A Winter's Day
Art Attack
Cleaning Day
Mrs B's Birthday
The Last Card
Wash Day

Videogames
Run (2005) (BBC Interactive/Monterosa)
Halcyon Sun (2002) (Kuju Entertainment)
Sky Storm (2002) (unpublished) (Kuju Entertainment)
Thunderbirds (2002) (unpublished) (Kuju Entertainment)
Warhammer 40,000: Fire Warrior (1999) (writer/script editor) (Kuju Entertainment)

Fiction

Original Children's Fiction
One of Our Demons is Missing
A Visit From Beyond

Novellas/Short fiction
Warhammer 40,000
Xenocide
Descent
Apothecary's Honour
Hell in a Bottle
Loyalty's Reward
Warhammer Fantasy
A Good Thief
2000AD
Judge Dredd: Black Atlantic (with Peter J. Evans)

Comics

The Enlghtement of Ly-Chee The Wise a 5-page comic strip in The Incredible Hulk Presents #10 (with Andrew Wildman, Marvel UK, 1989)
James Bond:
 A Silent Armageddon #1-2 (with John Burns, proposed 4-issue mini-series, Dark Horse Comics, 1993)
 Shattered Helix (with David Jackson, David Lloyd, 2-issue mini-series, 1994)
Black Axe (with pencils by Edmund Perryman and inks by Rodney Ramos, 7-issue mini-series, Marvel UK, 1993)
Wild Things #1-7 (with Duke Mighten, Marvel UK, 1993))
Dances With Demons (with pencils by Charlie Adlard and inks by Rodney Ramos, 4-issue mini-series, Marvel UK, 1993)
Marvel Comics Presents #164-167 ("Behold the Man-Thing") (Marvel Comics, 1994)
Vector 13: "Case One: Extraction Point" (in 2000 AD #988, 1996)

References

Simon Jowett at 2000 AD online

External links

Year of birth missing (living people)
Living people
20th-century English non-fiction writers
21st-century English novelists
English science fiction writers
English comics writers
English children's writers
English male novelists
English television writers
Warhammer 40,000 writers
20th-century English male writers
21st-century English male writers
English male non-fiction writers
British male television writers